The 1926 Lübeck state election was held on 14 November 1926 to elect the 80 members of the Bürgerschaft, the state parliament of the Free and Hanseatic City of Lübeck.

Results

References 

Lübeck
Elections in Schleswig-Holstein